The lateral aperture is a paired structure in human anatomy. It is an opening in each lateral extremity of the lateral recess of the fourth ventricle of the human brain, which also has a single median aperture. The two lateral apertures provide a conduit for cerebrospinal fluid to flow from the brain's ventricular system into the subarachnoid space; specifically into the pontocerebellar cistern at the cerebellopontine angle. The structure is also called the lateral aperture of the fourth ventricle or the foramen of Luschka after anatomist Hubert von Luschka.

Gross total resection of tumours that extend through foramen of Lushka is sometimes not possible due to bradycardia.

References

Ventricular system